Pollen was a power pop band originally hailing from Pittsburgh, Pennsylvania. They released four albums and two split records over their eight years together.  In 2021, it was announced that their third record, Peach Tree, would be re-released on vinyl for the first time.

Band members
Dan Hargest (Vocals)
Kevin Scanlon (Guitar)
Chris Serafini (Bass)
Mike Bennett (Guitar)
Bob Hoag (Drums)

Discography

Albums

Compilations
 Not One Light Red: A Modified Document (Sunset Alliance, 2000)
Track: A Clear Complexion

References

External links
Group Efforts from the Phoenix

Unofficial Sites
A Pollen Fan Site

American power pop groups
Indie rock musical groups from Pennsylvania
Musical groups from Pittsburgh